Thukela WMA, or Thukela Water Management Area (coded: 7), (also known as the Tugela WMA), Includes only the following major river: the Thukela River, and covers the following Dams:

 Craigie Burn Dam Mnyamvubu River 
 Driel Barrage Tugela River 
 Mearns Dam Mooi River 
 Ntshingwayo Dam Ngagane River 
 Spioenkop Dam Tugela River 
 Wagendrift Dam Boesmans River 
 Woodstock Dam Tugela River 
 Zaaihoek Dam Slang River

Boundaries 
Primary drainage region V.

References 
http://www.dwaf.gov.za/Hydrology/

Water Management Areas
Dams in South Africa